Hardy L. Shirley was a well-known forester, author and dean of the SUNY College of Environmental Science and Forestry.

Early life and education 

Shirley graduated from Indiana University in 1922 and received his doctorate in 1928 from the School of Forestry at Yale University.

Career 

Shirley taught at the University of Nevada and Boyce Thompson Institute in Yonkers. He was senior silviculturist at the Lake
States Forest Experiment Station in  St. Paul, Minnesota, and was director of the U.S. Forestry Service experiment Station in Philadelphia,
Pennsylvania.

From 1945 to 1952 Shirley was the assistant dean of the SUNY College of Environmental Science and Forestry. From 1952 to 1967 Shirley was dean of the SUNY College of Environmental Science and Forestry. During his tenure as Dean of SUNY ESF, graduate enrollment more than  tripled, the  college  became  the  first to offer bachelor's  and, master's degrees in landscape   architecture and the Hugh P. Baker Wood Products Lab-oratory was constructed on the college's main campus in Syracuse, New York.

References

External links 
The Archives from Hardy Shirley's tenure as dean of the New York State College of Forestry are located in the Archives of the SUNY College of Environmental Sciences and Forestry
 Hugh Canham SUNY-ESF: 100 YEARS AND STILL GOING STRONG 1911–2011

State University of New York College of Environmental Science and Forestry faculty
Leaders of the State University of New York College of Environmental Science and Forestry
Indiana University Bloomington alumni
Yale School of Forestry & Environmental Studies alumni
1996 deaths